The Queen's Necklace (French: L'affaire du collier de la reine) is a 1946 French historical drama film directed by Marcel L'Herbier and starring Viviane Romance, Maurice Escande and Jacques Dacqmine. The film portrays the Affair of the Diamond Necklace which damaged the reputation of the French queen Marie Antionette during the 1780s.

It was shot at the Saint-Maurice Studios and on location at the Palace of Versailles. The film's sets were designed by the art director Max Douy.

Cast
 Viviane Romance as Jeanne de la Motte
 Maurice Escande as Cardinal de Rohan
 Jacques Dacqmine as Rétaux de Villette
 Michel Salina as Comte de la Motte
 Jean Hébey as King Louis XVI
 Marion Dorian as Marie Antoinette
 Pierre Dux as Cagliostro
 Jean-Louis Allibert as Camille Desmoulins
 Pierre Bertin as Abbé Loth 
 Palau as Boehmer  
 Pierre Magnier as Procureur Joly de Fleury  
 Paul Amiot as Maître Doillot, l'avocat de Jeanne  
 Marcel Delaître as Maître Target, l'avocat de Rohan  
 Hélène Bellanger as Duchess of Polignac
 Florence Lynn as Princesse de Lamballe  
 Robert Dartois as Monsieur de Soubise  
 Saint-Pol as Bijoutier Bassange  
 André Philip as Deschamps  
 André Varennes as Premier président d'Aligre 
 Marcel Vibert as Avocat général Séguier  
 André Wasley as Pierre André de Suffren
 Marcel Lagrange as Duc de Villeroi  
 Monique Cassin as Nicole, la fille Oliva  
 Luc Andrieux as Un geôlier  
 Jacques Berlioz
 Chukry-Bey
 Jacques François as Comte d'Artois  
 Lucas Gridoux as Un membre du Parlement  
 Pierre Labry as Hubert 
 Philippe Lemaire 
 Johnny Marchand 
 Jean-Pierre Mocky as Un page de la reine  
 Jean Morel as M. de Breteuil  
 Paul Ménager 
 Philippe Olive as Maître Breton  
 Georges Paulais as Un huissier  
 Marcel Rouzé 
 Roger Vincent as Un abbé de cour 
 Yvonne Yma as La femme Hubert

References

Bibliography 
 Klossner, Michael. The Europe of 1500-1815 on Film and Television: A Worldwide Filmography of Over 2550 Works, 1895 Through 2000. McFarland, 2002.

External links 
 

1946 films
1940s historical films
French historical films
1940s French-language films
Films directed by Marcel L'Herbier
Films set in the 1780s
French black-and-white films
Works about the Affair of the Diamond Necklace
Cultural depictions of Louis XVI
Films about Marie Antoinette
Films about Alessandro Cagliostro
Films about jewellery
1940s French films